Jarich Hendrik Bakker (born 29 March 1974) competed as a track cyclist for the Netherlands at the 1996 Summer Olympics. Born in Leeuwarden, he participated in the men's team pursuit at the 1996 Summer Olympics, finishing 12th.

See also
 List of Dutch Olympic cyclists

References

1974 births
Dutch male cyclists
Olympic cyclists of the Netherlands
Cyclists at the 1996 Summer Olympics
Sportspeople from Leeuwarden
Living people
Cyclists from Friesland
20th-century Dutch people